Lyal S. Sunga is a well-known specialist on international human rights law, international humanitarian law and international criminal law.

Career
Sunga is a visiting professor in Peace Studies and International Relations and Global Politics at The American University of Rome, visiting professor at the Raoul Wallenberg Institute of Human Rights and Humanitarian Law in Lund University, Sweden, visiting professor at the Strathmore University School of Law in Nairobi, Kenya, and RWI visiting professor at Addis Ababa University in Ethiopia. He also teaches International Criminal Law, Human Rights, Terrorism and Counter-Terrorism, Public International Law, and Genocide at John Cabot University in Rome, Italy. He is also a former Head of the Rule of Law program at The Hague Institute for Global Justice in the Netherlands, and former Special Advisor on Human Rights and Humanitarian Law at the International Development Law Organization in Rome, Italy. He was responsible in 1994 for supporting the UN Security Council's genocide investigations in Rwanda and he served as Human Rights Officer in the United Nations as a staff member from 1994–2001, mainly on problems relating to serious human rights and humanitarian law violations, including terrorism and counter-terrorism, issues involving war and recovery from post-conflict situations, as well as on fact-finding, monitoring, investigation and reporting. He has also been an expert consultant for the Office of the UN High Commissioner for Human Rights, United Nations University, United Nations Development Program, International Labour Organization, the United Nations High Commissioner for Refugees, United Nations Office on Drugs and Crime, European Union, Council of Europe, International Development Law Organization, and National Human Rights Commissions in Bangladesh, Ethiopia, Nepal, Nigeria, Russia, Turkey and Uganda. In May 2012, he launched a major study on the role of national human rights institutions in federal States which he prepared for the Office of the UN High Commissioner for Human Rights in Moscow at a conference with representatives of more than 60 national human rights institutions of the Russian Federation.

Sunga has been a Lecturer, Senior Lecturer or Visiting Professor in faculties of law at McGill University, Carleton University, Helsinki University, Padjadjaran University, University of Geneva, University of Hong Kong, Peking University, Lund University, The American University of Rome, Strathmore University, Addis Ababa University and John Cabot University on human rights, humanitarian law, international criminal law and terrorism and counter-terrorism.

Sunga holds a Bachelor of Arts from Carleton University, a Bachelor of Laws from Osgoode Hall Law School, a Master of Laws in International Human Rights Law from the University of Essex and a Ph.D. in International Law from the Graduate Institute of International Studies. Before joining the Raoul Wallenberg Institute he was a member of the faculty at the University of Hong Kong where he taught classes in law and served as Director of the Master of Laws Program in Human Rights (2001–2005). He has given university courses, lectures, training or conference presentations in approximately 55 countries. Sunga's work has been published in numerous scholarly academic journals and he has authored two influential books on international criminal law. He has given lectures and moderated panels at the United Nations Office of the High Commissioner for Human Rights, International Criminal Tribunal for Rwanda, the International Criminal Court, the T.M.C. Asser Instituut, the Graduate Institute of International and Development Studies and The Hague Institute for Global Justice, among other places.

From 1994 to 2001 Sunga worked for the United Nations Office of the High Commissioner for Human Rights in Geneva, first to assist in the investigation of facts and responsibilities relating to the 1994 genocide in Rwanda for the UN Security Council's Commission of Experts on Rwanda to draft the Commission's report recommending the establishment of the International Criminal Tribunal for Rwanda, and then on the establishment and operation of the UN Human Rights Field Operation in Rwanda. He also has practical experience and expertise relating to the International Criminal Court including having served as OHCHR representative to the United Nations Diplomatic Conference of Plenipotentiaries on the Establishment of an International Criminal Court that adopted the Rome Statute of the International Criminal Court, terrorism, redress for violations of international human rights and humanitarian law, impunity, the death penalty, human rights defenders, the administration of justice, the role of human rights NGOs in fact-finding, and the relation between national truth and reconciliation commissions and criminal prosecutions.

From September to December 2007 Dr. Sunga took leave from the Raoul Wallenberg Institute to act as Geneva-based coordinator of the UN Human Rights Council's Group of Experts on Darfur, mandated to assess the Government of the Sudan's implementation of UN recommendations concerning serious violations of human rights and humanitarian law committed during the war in Darfur.

Sunga has commented on breaking news stories for Voice of America, CNN affiliate N1 in Sarajevo, PBS, China Global Television Network, The Guardian, Indus News, Metro International, Legal Talk Network, Australian Broadcasting Corporation, New Delhi TV, South China Morning Post, RT, Agence France-Presse, TV5 Monde, O Estado de S. Paulo, Estado de Minas, Business Standard, El Periódico de Catalunya and others. He also contributed to the discussion of ICTY rulings related to the Srebrenica Massacre, in his review of Yugoslavia: Peace, War, and Dissolution, edited book by Noam Chomsky and Davor Džalto.

Published works

Books
 The Emerging System of International Criminal Law: Developments in Codification and Implementation, Kluwer (1997) 508 p.
 Individual Responsibility in International Law for Serious Human Rights Violations, Nijhoff (1992) 252 p.

Book sections
 Redress  for Victims of Terrorist Acts in a Deteriorating International Political Climate, co-authored with Ilaria Bottigliero, in Research Handbook on Int’l Law and Terrorism, (ed. Ben Saul), Elgar Publishers (2020) 479-491.
 Review of Noam Chomsky, Yugoslavia: Peace, War & Dissolution, Davor Džalto (ed.), PM Press, Oakland, (2018)in 30(3) Philosophy & Society (Filozofija i Društvo) (2019):433-442.
 Can Human Rights NGOs Be Trusted in the Corridors of the United Nations and International Criminal Justice Institutions?, in Partnerships in International Policy-Making, Palgrave (2017) 107-129.
 Has the ICC Unfairly Targeted Africa or Has Africa Unfairly Targeted the ICC?, in The ICC in Search of Its Purpose and Identity, Routledge (2015) 147-173.
 Victims' Redress amidst Terrorism’s Changing Tactics and Strategies, in Research Handbook on Terrorism and International Law, Elgar Publications, (co-authored with Ilaria Bottigliero) (2014) 538-552.
 Can international criminal investigators and prosecutors afford to ignore information from UN human rights sources? in Bergsmo (ed.) Quality Control in International Fact-Finding (2013) 359-401.
 The Human Rights Council, in An Institutional Approach to Responsibility to Protect: Cambridge (2013) 156-178.
 Humanitarian Space in the Arab Spring, in Humanitarian Space: Webster University (2011) 282-320.
 What Should Be the UN Human Rights Council’s Role in Investigating Genocide, War Crimes and Crimes against Humanity?  in New Challenges for the UN Human Rights Machinery (2011) 319-349.
 What Makes Democracy Good? in "Making Peoples Heard", Martinus Nijhoff Publishers (2011) 81-98.
 Does the Concept of 'Human Security' Add Anything of Value to International Legal Theory or Practice? in “Power and Justice in International Relations” Ashgate (2009) 131–146.
 What Effect If Any Will the UN Human Rights Council Have on Special Procedures? in International Human Rights Monitoring Mechanisms (2nd ed.)(2009)169–183.
 Ten Principles for Reconciling Truth Commissions and Criminal Prosecutions, in The Legal Regime of the ICC, Brill (2009) 1071–1104.
 Is Humanitarian Intervention Legal?, on“e-international relations website” 13 October 2008.
 Dilemmas of NGO Involvement in Coalition-Occupied Iraq, in Bell and Coicaud, Ethics in Action: The Ethical Challenges of International Human Rights Nongovernmental Organizations, United Nations University (2007) 99–116.
 The Role of Humanitarian Intervention in International Peace and Security: Guarantee or Threat? Int’l Progress Organization & Google Books (2006) 41–79.
 NGO Involvement in International Human Rights Monitoring, in International Human Rights Law and Non-Governmental Organizations, Bruylant (2005) 41–69.
 International Criminal Law Protection of Minority Rights, in Skurbaty (ed), Beyond a One-Dimensional State: An Emerging Right to Autonomy? Brill (2004).
 Independence and Fairness of the ICC, in Study on Major Issues Relating to the International Criminal Court (People's Court Press) (2003) 24–30 (in Putonghua).
 US Anti-Terrorism Policy and Asia's Options, in Johannen, Smith and Gomez, (eds.) September 11 & Political Freedoms: Asian Perspectives (Select) (2002) 242–264.
 Full Respect for the Rights of Suspect, Accused and Convict: from Nuremberg and Tokyo to the ICC, in Henzelin and Roth (eds), Le droit pénal à l’épreuve de l’internationalisation, (Bruylant) (2002) 217–239.
 The Special Procedures of the United Nations Commission on Human Rights: Should They Be Scrapped?, in Alfredsson (ed), International Human Rights Monitoring Mechanisms (Kluwer) (2001) 231–275.
 A Competência Ratione Materiae da Corte Internacional Criminal: Arts. 5 a 10 Do Estatuto de Roma, in Ambos and Choukr (eds.) Tribunal Penal Internacional (Editora RT) (2000) 191 – 219 (in Portuguese).
 La Jurisdicción ratione materiae de la Corte Penal Internacional (parte II, arts. 5° a 10°), in Ambos (eds.) El Estatuto de Roma: de la Corte Penal Internacional (Universidad externado de Colombia) (1999) 233–268 (in Spanish).

Law journal articles
 How Should UN Standards Guide International Judicial Training in Post-Conflict Situations?: Personal Reflections Twenty Years after the Rwandan genocide, 2 Int’l Org. for Judicial Training (2014).
 Does Climate Change worsen Resource Scarcity and Cause Violent Ethnic Conflict?  21 International Journal of Minority and Group Rights (2014) 1-24.
 Commentary on Judgement of the ICTR's Case of Prosecutor v. Zigiranyirazo, 32 Annotated Leading Cases of International Criminal Tribunals (2011) 240-258.
 Does Climate Change Kill People in Darfur? 2(1) Journal of Human Rights and the Environment (March 2011) 64-85.
 How Can UN Human Rights Special Procedures Sharpen ICC Fact-Finding? 15(2) The International Journal of Human Rights (2011) 187-204.
 Introduction to the “Lund Statement to the United Nations Human Rights Council on the Human Rights Special Procedures” 76 Nordic Journal of International Law (2007) 1–20.
 The Kordic and Cerkez Trial Chamber Judgment: A Comment on the Main Legal Issues 7 Series of Annotated Leading Cases of International Criminal Tribunals (2004) 490–511.
 The International Community's Recognition of Certain Acts as ‘Crimes under International Law’, International Review of Penal Law (Erès) Proceedings of the International Conference held in Siracusa, Italy, 28 November – 3 December 2002, on the occasion of the 30th anniversary of ISISC (2004) 303–315.
 Can International Humanitarian Law Play an Effective Role in Occupied Iraq? 3 Indian Society of International Law Yearbook of International Humanitarian and Refugee Law (2003) 1–21.
 Musings on ‘The Future of International Criminal Justice’, (Review Article) 11(2) Asia Pacific Law Review (2003) 217–232.
 Will the International Criminal Court be Fair and Impartial?, 2 (1) Article 2 (February 2003) 9–20.
 The Attitude of Asian Countries Towards the International Criminal Court, 2 Indian Society of International Law Yearbook of International Humanitarian and Refugee Law (2002) 18–57.
 The United Nations System for the Promotion and Protection of Human Rights with Special Reference to South Korea and the New National Human Rights Commission, 4 Sang Saeng (Summer 2002) 45–50.
 The Celebici Case: A Comment on the Main Legal Issues in the ICTY's Trial Chamber Judgement, 13 Leiden Journal of International Law (2000) 105–138.
 The Crimes within the Jurisdiction of the International Criminal Court: (Part II, Articles 5 – 10), 6/4 European Journal of Crime, Criminal Law and Criminal Justice (1998) 377–399.
 The First Indictments of the ICTR, 18 Human Rights Law Journal (1997) 329–340.
 The Comm’n of Experts on Rwanda and Creation of the ICTR 16 Human Rights Law Journal (1995) 121–124.

Selected reports for the United Nations and European Union
 The COVID-19 Pandemic: Exacerbating the Threat of Corruption to Human Rights and Sustainable Development in Pacific Island Countries (Lead Expert) 2021, 56 p.
 A Critical Appraisal of Laws relating to Sexual Offences in Bangladesh (with Kawser Ahmed) 2015, 48 p.
 Bangladesh NHRC reports - UN Committee against Torture and UN Committee on the Rights of the Child (with Kawser Ahmed) 2013-2015.
 Report of Bangladesh NHRC to CEDAW on the Government's 2015 State Report 2015, 39 p.
 Toolkit on Implementing UN Human Rights Recommendations and UPR, UNDP-Ankara, Turkey 2014. 119 p.
 National Human Rights Institutions in Federal States for UNOHCHR, Geneva, May–July 2011, 85 p.
 Expert Background Papers for the 12th European Union-NGO Human Rights Forum, 12–13 July 2010 in Brussels, Belgium.
 Expert Background Paper for Workshop on International Criminal Justice Education for the Rule of Law at the 12th United Nations Congress on Crime Prevention and Criminal Justice, 12–19 April 2010 in Salvador, Brazil — UN Doc. A/CONF.213/12 of 5 February 2010.
 In-Depth Study on the Linkages between Anti-Corruption and Human Rights for the United Nations Development Program Including ‘Concept Note’ and Appendix (2007, pp 79).
 Expert Background Paper "Impunity as a Threat to Democracy, Human Rights and the Rule of Law", presented at the UN Office of the High Commissioner for Human Rights Expert Seminar on the interdependence between democracy and human rights, 28 February – 2 March 2005 in Geneva, Switzerland.
 Report of the Second Expert Seminar on "Democracy and the Rule of Law" (Geneva, 28 February – 2 March 2005); UN Doc. E/CN.4/2005/58 of 18 March 2005.

References
Home Page for lyalsunga.com - Lyal S. Sunga's Website
Lyal S. Sunga - Raoul Wallenberg Institute
Is Humanitarian Intervention Legal?

Project DIANA : Doe v. Karadzic : Brief of Plaintiffs-Appellants

Year of birth missing (living people)
Living people
United Nations High Commissioner for Human Rights officials
International law scholars
Human rights activists
University of Geneva alumni
Graduate Institute of International and Development Studies alumni